Zurab Papaskiri (in Georgian ზურაბ პაპასქირი) is a Georgian Historian and public figure, academician of the Abkhazian Regional Academy of Sciences (1997), Doctor of Historical sciences (1991), Professor (1994), owner of the State Prize of Giorgi Shervashidze (1998), owner of Order of Honour (2013).

Zurab Papaskiri was born in 1950 in Zugdidi. He graduated from the Faculty of History of Tbilisi State University (1972). From 1972 to 1975, he was a post-graduate student of the Lomonosov Moscow State University. In 1978 Papaskiri received a PhD in history, in 1991 the degree of Doctor of historical sciences (Habilitation). Since 1976 he has worked at Sokhumi State University (since 1993 this university is based in Tbilisi). Since 2008 he has been head of the Scientific Work Coordination Service of the university, since 2007, deputy chairman of the main editorial board of the "Proceedings of the Sokhumi State University", and Editor-in-Chief  of the „Proceedings of Sokhumi State University“. Humanities, Social and Political Sciences Series. Papaskiri is Chairman of the Abkhazian Organization of the Georgian Historical Society by Ekvtime Takaishvili, and Editor-in-Chief of the „Historical Researches“ ("Saistorio Dziebani").  also since 1998.

Literature
Zurab Papaskiri – 60. Inscribing Annals is Talking the Truth. The Collection is dedicated to the 60th birth anniversary of the Doctor of Historical sciences, Professor Zurab Papaskiri. Sokhumi State University Press. Tbilisi – 2010-2013.

References

External links
 

1950 births
20th-century historians from Georgia (country)
People from Sukhumi
Tbilisi State University alumni
Living people
21st-century historians from Georgia (country)